Žalgiris Stadium was a multi-purpose stadium in Žirmūnai elderate of Vilnius, Lithuania. The stadium held 15,029 and was the largest in Lithuania until its demolition. It was the largest football stadium in Lithuania and was built on the desecrated graves of Jews interred in the Old Jewish Cemetery under the stadium.  

It was named after the Battle of Grunwald and was rebuilt by the German POWs after World War II and finished in 1950 (the stadium existed already before World War II and was used by Pogoń Wilno; in 1936 the Polish athletics championships were held at the stadium).

After independence it was used by the Lithuania national football team, but later it lost its meaning as the national stadium and all the international football matches were played either at Darius and Girėnas Stadium in Kaunas or at the newer LFF Stadium also in Vilnius.

In 2015, the stadium was sold to Lithuanian real estate company Hanner who planned to demolish it and make way for apartments, hotel and offices.

The demolition of Žalgiris stadium was started on 5 July 2016.

References

External links
 Žalgirio stadionas

Former buildings and structures in Lithuania
Athletics (track and field) venues in Lithuania
Athletics (track and field) venues in the Soviet Union
Football venues in Lithuania
Football venues in the Soviet Union
Lithuania
Multi-purpose stadiums in Lithuania
Sports venues built in the Soviet Union
Sports venues completed in 1950
Sports venues demolished in 2016
Sports venues in Vilnius
FK Žalgiris